James William Murray Dalrymple (born 21 January 1981) is a Kenyan-born former English cricketer, who played ODIs and T20Is for England. He is a right-handed batsman and off-spin bowler.

He is perhaps best known for taking a spectacular diving catch in a One Day International against Australia in 2007.

Domestic career 
Born in Nairobi, Kenya, Dalrymple made a double-century in 2003, becoming only the third batsman to do so in a Varsity match. Dalrymple has represented England at under-19 level against Sri Lanka, before captaining British Universities.

In 1999, he joined Middlesex, and with them made a career-best innings of 244 at The Oval in 2004, despite only being present as a substitute for Andrew Strauss, away making his international debut.

In November 2007, he announced he was to leave Middlesex, having turned down the offer of a new contract, saying: 'the time was right to seek a fresh challenge.' The next day, Glamorgan announced that Dalrymple had signed a three-year deal with them.

It was announced in October 2008 that Dalrymple has been appointed County Captain for the 2009 season, succeeding David Hemp.

In November 2010, he resigned from Glamorgan as a player, after being replaced as captain by incoming South African, Alviro Petersen; and, in April 2011, it was announced that he had rejoined Middlesex.

After contributing 505 runs and 10 wickets to Middlesex's 2011 County Championship season, Dalrymple was released at the end of the summer.

In July 2022, Dalrymple made his debut for Mullion Cricket Club in Cornwall where his brother Simon Dalrymple plays. He made an unbeaten 75 in a narrow victory.

International career
In June 2006, he made his One Day International debut against Ireland at Stormont, Belfast, scoring 17 off as many balls, and taking 1–51 from nine overs. He also made his Twenty20 International debut against Sri Lanka later that month, taking 1–17 from two overs and scoring 1.

In addition, Dalrymple was selected in the squad to face Pakistan in the 2nd Test at Old Trafford, in what would have been his debut Test appearance. However, he was released from the squad prior to the match, with Monty Panesar preferred instead.

Dalrymple also toured India with the English One Day International team, to compete in the 2006 ICC Champions Trophy.

On 16 December 2006, he was drafted into the England Ashes Squad to replace Ashley Giles, who had flown back to England to tend to his sick wife. Although he did not play in any Test matches, he was a key member of the team during the Commonwealth Bank one-day series that followed, making a superb diving catch to dismiss Australia's Shane Watson as England won the second final.

Dalrymple was selected for England's first two games of 2007 Cricket World Cup. However, after posting only scores of 2 and 3, and taking only one wicket, he was dropped. He did, however, return for England's final game of the Super 8 series against the West Indies.

Personal life 
Like former Middlesex teammates Andrew Strauss and Ben Hutton, Dalrymple was educated at Radley College, before going on to study Modern History at St Peter's College, Oxford, achieving a 2:1 whilst also captaining the Blues. He is married to Sophie Sackler.

His grandfather, Ian Dalrymple, was a successful screenwriter, film director, and producer, who introduced Dirk Bogarde to the British Cinema in "Esther Waters" (1948).

References

External links
 Jamie Dalrymple at ECB
 
 

English cricketers
England Twenty20 International cricketers
England One Day International cricketers
Glamorgan cricket captains
Glamorgan cricketers
Kenyan emigrants to the United Kingdom
Middlesex cricketers
Oxford University cricketers
People educated at Radley College
Alumni of St Peter's College, Oxford
1981 births
Living people
Cricketers from Nairobi
Oxford MCCU cricketers
Conservative Party (UK) people
White Kenyan people
British Universities cricketers
Sackler family